George Christopher Pinner (born 18 January 1987) is an English field hockey player who plays as a goalkeeper for Old Georgians and from 2009 to 2021 played for the England and Great Britain national teams.

Personal life
In June 2012 he was one of seven GB hockey athletes to pose for the centerfold of Cosmopolitan magazine as part of a campaign to raise awareness of male cancers and the Everyman cancer charity. In 2017 Pinner married England hockey international Jo Hunter.

Club career
Pinner plays club hockey in the Men's England Hockey League Premier Division for Old Georgians. He has also played club hockey for Ipswich, Beeston and Holcombe. On 30 May 2019 it was announced that he was joining Old Georgians ahead of their first season in the Men's England Hockey League Premier Division.

International career
He made his senior international debut in 2009 against the Netherlands and his tournament debut at the 2011 Champions Trophy. He was the reserve goalkeeper at the 2012 Olympic Games. He won goalkeeper of the tournament at the 2016 Champions Trophy before heading off to Rio for his first Olympics as the first goalkeeper. On 4 November 2021 he announced his retirement from International Hockey

References

External links
 

British male field hockey players
Living people
1987 births
Sportspeople from Ipswich
Male field hockey goalkeepers
Field hockey players at the 2012 Summer Olympics
2014 Men's Hockey World Cup players
Field hockey players at the 2014 Commonwealth Games
Field hockey players at the 2016 Summer Olympics
Field hockey players at the 2018 Commonwealth Games
2018 Men's Hockey World Cup players
Olympic field hockey players of Great Britain
Commonwealth Games medallists in field hockey
Commonwealth Games bronze medallists for England
Holcombe Hockey Club players
Beeston Hockey Club players
Men's England Hockey League players
Medallists at the 2014 Commonwealth Games
Medallists at the 2018 Commonwealth Games